Steven G. Rogelberg is Chancellor's Professor at University of North Carolina at Charlotte. He is a professor of Organizational Science, Management, and Psychology and the founding Director of Organizational Science at UNC, Charlotte. He has over 100 publications addressing issues such as team effectiveness, leadership, engagement, health and employee well-being, meetings at work, and organizational research methods. He is editor of the Journal of Business and Psychology. Dr. Rogelberg has received over $2,500,000 of external grant funding including from the National Science Foundation.  

Awards and honors include receiving the 2017 Humboldt Award, the 2019 recipient of the First Citizens Bank Scholar Award, being the inaugural winner of the Society for Industrial and Organizational Psychology (SIOP) Humanitarian Award, receiving the SIOP Distinguished Service Award, Bowling Green State University (BGSU) Master Teacher Award, Psi Chi Professor of the Year Award, Fellow of the Society for Industrial and Organizational Psychology, Fellow of the Association for Psychological Science, and serving as the 2000 BGSU graduation commencement speaker.  

He is currently Immediate Past President of the Society of Industrial and Organizational Psychology (SIOP) (and executive board member) and the past Secretary General of the Alliance for Organizational Psychology.  He served SIOP in a host of additional roles including Executive Board Member, Research & Science Officer, Chair of Education & Training, and Program Chair.

His research has been profiled on television (CBS This Morning, BBC world), radio (e.g., NPR, CBC, CBS), newspapers (e.g., Chicago Tribune, LA Times, Wall Street Journal, Washington Post, London Guardian) and magazines (e.g., National Geographic, Forbes, Scientific American Mind).  

Rogelberg was invited and testified to the US Congress (2022) on the topic of being successful and engaging others in very difficult working environments – using organizational psychology to elevate members of congress, their staffs, and the institution.

Dr. Rogelberg has run three consulting centers, engaged with many Fortune 100 companies, and served on multiple advisory boards.  He founded and currently directs two large outreach initiatives, spanning 8 universities, focusing on nonprofit organization effectiveness. Over 1,000 nonprofits have been served.

Before completing his Ph.D. in Industrial/Organizational Psychology at the University of Connecticut in 1994, he received his undergraduate B.Sc. degree from Tufts University in 1989.

His most recent book, The Surprising Science of Meetings, was named by The Washington Post as one of the 10 books to watch for in 2019 and Business Insider as one of the “Top 14 business books everyone will be reading in 2019.” 

Dr. Rogelberg has a new book coming out specific to facilitating one-on-one meetings. In this book, Rogelberg presents strategies to elevate 1:1 meetings, unleashing the true potential of these transformative interactions.

Awards
 Raymond A. Katzell Award for I-O Psychology in 2022
 SIOP President 2021
Belk College of Business Scholar Award 2020
Recipient of the First Citizens Bank Scholars Medal in 2019

Selected publications
Rogelberg is the author of over 100 publications.

References

External links
 Personal Website 
 
 
 
 

1967 births
21st-century American psychologists
Bowling Green State University faculty
Living people
Organizational psychologists
Tufts University alumni
University of Connecticut alumni
University of North Carolina faculty
Business and management journal editors
20th-century American psychologists